Noonilla is a genus of ants of uncertain placement in the family Formicidae. It contains the single species Noonilla copiosa, first described by Petersen in 1968 based on male specimen from the Philippines . Noonilla was initially placed in the subfamily Leptanillinae, but was later removed from the subfamily when Ogata, Terayama & Masuko (1995) reviewed the genus, leaving the genus incertae sedis in the family.

References

Monotypic ant genera
Hymenoptera of Asia
Formicidae incertae sedis